Border infrastructure in the borderlands of India and China encompasses irrigation, roads, railways, airports, natural gas and oil pipelines, electricity grids, telecommunications, and broadcasting. In the context of the border tensions between India and China, many of these infrastructure projects in the borderlands are considered strategic in nature. Commentators have noted the infrastructure gap that existed, and still exists, between the infrastructure on the borderlands of India and China. For many decades, the approach taken to the construction of border infrastructure by China and India was significantly different, however, in terms of utilizing the natural resources of the borderlands for the needs of the country, both countries are said to have a similar approach.

China 

New Chinese border villages (with claimed location):
 2020: Pangda (Bhutan)
 2021:  (Arunachal Pradesh); Kyungling (Arunachal Pradesh)
China has developed a number of  "xiaokang" or "model well-off border defence villages". The number of villages 624, 680, and 965. Container architecture at Tunjum La near Barahoti.

India

Border Area Development Programme 
The Border Area Development Programme (BADP) was initiated in the 1980s along the western border with Pakistan. By June 2020, the scheme covered nearly 400 blocks in 111 border districts in 18 states and union territories. This scheme extends to development projects within 10 km of the border. Projects can include roads, bridges, health facilities, primary schools, irrigation, and sports facilities. In 2019–20, the scheme was allotted , while in 2020-21 it was allotted . 

In 1997, BADP started in Arunachal Pradesh. It first applied to the Indo-Myanmar Border and in 1998 was extended to the Indo-China and Indo-Bhutan borders. Even after ten years, BADP was unable to provide development to the over 1500 villages in the border blocks of Arunachal Pradesh; "the border blocks are yet to be opened up and are in utter backwardness due to their isolation and inaccessibility". A NITI Aayog evaluation study for the period 2007-2011 and published in 2015 found that while the heads of Gram Panchayats (GPs) gave positive feedback related to BADP, and while people have benefitted in some ways, the requirement of border villages in Arunachal Pradesh were so great that they couldn't be met by BADP in one go:

See also 

 India-China Border Roads

References 
Notes

Citations

Sources

Further reading 
 
 
 
  
 
 
 

China–India border
China–India relations